Raqqa Subdistrict or ar-Raqqah Nahiyah, a subdistrict of Raqqa District, is the central area of Raqqa Governorate (Syria), including the city of Raqqa and the nearby countryside north of the Euphrates. The subdistrict population at the 2004 census was 338,773, the majority of which living in Raqqa city itself.

The administrative centre is Raqqa. Formerly, much of the subdistrict was controlled by ISIS.

Raqqa Subdistrict is bounded by the Euphrates to the South, Tal Abyad District to the North, and also of Raqqa District: Al-Jarniyah Subdistrict to the West, and Al-Karamah Subdistrict to the East.

Towns and villages

The towns and villages in Raqqa Subdistrict and their populations as at the 2004 census were:
 Abbara (لعبارة), pop 1305
 Abu Kabret Al Rashid (أبو كبرة-الرشيد), pop 686
 Abu Rajab (أبو رجب), pop 844
 Abu Suseh (أبو سوسة), pop 2561
 Adnaniyeh (لعدنانية), pop 1931
 Andalus (لأندلس), pop 1000
 Raqqa (لرقة), pop 220488
 Assadiya (لأسدية), pop 3992
 Atshana (لعطشانة), pop 169
 Ayuj (لأعيوج), pop 659
 Berani (بعراني), pop 326
 Big Sweidiyeh (سويدية كبيرة), aka Suwaydiya Kabir, pop 6106
 Bir Elhasham (بئر الهشم), pop 79
 Bir Said (بئر سعيد), pop 117
 Eastern Khayala (لخيالة الشرقية), pop 4457
 Faraa (لفارعة), pop 3809
 Fteih (لفتيح), pop 390
 Ghota (لغوطة), pop 2163
 Hadba (لحدباء), pop 602
 Hawi Elhawa (حاوي الهوى), pop 1651
 Hazimeh (حزيمة), pop 3386
 Hettin (حطين), pop 2627
 Hfeiret Elsoqur (حفيرة الصقور), pop 138
 Hilo Abed (حلو عبد), pop 1443
 Htash (حتاش), pop 455
 Hweijet Faraj (حويجة فرج), pop 945
 Jalaa (لجلاء), pop 1253
 Kalta (لكالطة), pop 2626
 Kardus (كردوس), pop 158
 Katuniyeh (لخاتونية), pop 3651
 Kdeiran (كديران), pop 4697
 Khayala (لخيالة), pop 234
 Kisret Elsheikh Jomaa (كسرة شيخ الجمعة), pop 2956
 Laqta (لقطة), pop 529
 Little Sweidiyeh (سويدية صغيرة), aka Suwaydiya Saghirah, pop 809
 Marj Abu Shareb (مرج أبو شارب), pop 132
 Mashrafa (لمشرفة), pop 230
 Milsun (ميسلون), pop 1766
 Moezleh (معيزيلة), pop 646
 Qahtaniyeh (لقحطانية), pop 2490
 Rabee'a (ربيعة), pop 1906
 Raeqqet Samra (رقة سمرة), pop 4077
 Rahmaniya (لرحمانية), pop 513
 Rashidiyeh (لرشيد), pop 1626
 Rohayat (لرحيات), pop 1355
 Royan (رويان), pop 735
 Safyan (صفيان), pop 395
 Sahl (لسحل), pop 2772
 Shamiyeh (لشامية), pop 625
 Sukariyet Tal Elsamen (سكرية تل السمن), pop 1967
 Tal Elsamen Dahham (تل السمن دحام), pop 2530
 Talet Elansar (طالعة الأنصار), pop 190
 Tawi Rumman (طاوي رمان), pop 1348
 Thulth Khneiz (ثلث خنيز), pop 846
 Tishrine (تشرين), pop 1850
 Tweilah (لطويلعة), pop 196
 Um Elhweyeh (أم الحوية), pop 336
 Upper Khneiz (خنيز فوقاني), pop 1101
 Western Kabsh (كبش غربي), pop 1272
 Western Sahlabiyeh (لسلحبية غربية), pop 3568
 Widyan (لوديان, aka Bi'r Huwaym/Bir Khuwaym/بئر حويم), pop 831
 Wihdeh (لوحدة), pop 842
 Yaarub (يعرب), pop 1403
 Yamama (ليمامة), pop 1408
 Yarmuk (ليرموك), pop 3221
 Yathreb (يثرب), pop 1335
 Zahera (لزاهرة), pop 461
 ? (16 تشرين), pop 498
 ? (لأنصار), pop 1587
 ? (لثامرية), pop 43
 ? (لحمزة), pop 168
 ? (لحميدان), pop 62
 Dahlan or Dehlan (لدحلان), pop 102
 ? (لدرة), pop 339
 Drubiyeh (لدروبية), pop 1929
 ? (لدهموش), pop 590
 ? (لسلحبية شرقية), pop 1796
 ? (لصديق), pop 95
 ? (لفيحاء), pop 1218
 ? (لمظلة), pop 122
 ? (بئر الجربوع), pop 591
 ? (جهينة), pop 194
 ? (خربة اللحم), pop 40
 ? (خنيز الغانم), pop 858
 ? (رطلة), pop 4712
 ? (شنينة), pop 386
 ? (كبش وسطي), pop 383
 ? (كسرة عفنان), pop 986
 ? (مرندية غربية), pop 226
 ? (واسطة الرفدي), pop 103

Syrian civil war

By March 2013 all of the countryside and effectively the city had fallen into rebel hands.
During December 2016 the Syrian Democratic Forces drove ISIS out of most of the neighbouring Al-Jarniyah Subdistrict. Early in January 2017 the SDF extended their advance into south-western parts of Raqqa Subdistrict, occupying the area around Bi'r Huwaym / Widyan (Arabic: الوديان), and western Sweidiyeh.

The SDF extended their control the north of Raqqa Governorate into Raqqa Subdistrict as far south as the hill Tal Saman (Arabic: تل السمن), gaining control of Thulth Khneiz and several other villages in November 2016. At that time an elementary school and the water purification system in Sukariyet Tal Elsamen were severely damaged in air raids, and among other casualties one American Special Operations trooper died at Tal Saman. Further gains by the SDF were reported in January 2017 including Abu Suseh, Mashrafa and Ayuj. With the capture of Big Sweidiyeh on 21 January 2017, the SDF were in control of all parts of the nahiyah north of the irrigation canal running from Lake Assad to Tal Saman.

References

External links
 

Raqqa District
Subdistricts of Raqqa Governorate